Yehonatan Kashanian (born 15 January 1981), known professionally as Jonathan Kashanian, is an Israeli–Italian television personality and actor.

Biography
Kashanian was born in Ramat Gan, Israel, the son of Iranian Jewish parents, and grandson of Uzbekistani grandparents, who emigrated to Milan when he was three years old. In the early 2000s he chose the path of fashion; after graduating as a designer, he worked between fashion shows and showrooms.

Career
In 2004, on Channel 5, Kashanian participated in the fifth edition of Grande Fratello and won the reality show with 38% of the vote. In 2005 he was in the jury of Sei un mito on Canale 5.

From 2006 to 2016 he appeared on Verissimo, first as a regular guest, then later as an envoy, columnist, fashion expert, stylist and makeover designer.

In 2007 he takes part in the film by 2061: An Exceptional Year. In 2010 he participated in a cameo in the film A Natale mi sposo directed by Paolo Costella.

In 2018 he participated as a contestant in the thirteenth edition of L'isola dei famosi, hosted by Alessia Marcuzzi and aired on Canale 5, ranking fifth, being eliminated with 70% of the votes.

He is currently a radio host for RTL 102.5.

In the same year, he was among the jurors of Miss Italia and co-hosted the final night of Una voce per San Marino, a national final to select the Sammarinese representative at the Eurovision Song Contest 2022.

References

1981 births
Living people
People from Ramat Gan
Italian people of Israeli descent
Italian people of Iranian descent
Italian people of Uzbekistani descent
Israeli people of Iranian-Jewish descent
Israeli people of Uzbekistani descent
Israeli television personalities
Italian television personalities
21st-century Israeli male actors
21st-century Italian male actors
Big Brother (franchise) contestants
Big Brother (franchise) winners